Events from the year 1548 in France

Incumbents
 Monarch – Henry II

Events

 July 7 – A marriage treaty is signed between Scotland and France, whereby 5-year-old Mary, Queen of Scots, is betrothed to the future King Francis II of France.
 August 7 – Mary, Queen of Scots, leaves for France.

Births
 Catherine of Cleves
 André Guijon

Deaths

See also

References

1540s in France